

Corporations headquartered In Birmingham
 Alabama Power - division of Southern Company
 American Cast Iron Pipe Company (ACIPCO)
 Associated Grocers of the Southeast
 B.L. Harbert International - international construction company
 Blue Cross and Blue Shield of Alabama
 Books-A-Million
 Bradley Arant Boult Cummings LLP
 Brasfield & Gorrie
 Buffalo Rock Company
 Chester's International
 Coca-Cola Bottling Company, United
 Birmingham Speed of America, Inc.
 Diagnostic Health Corporation
 Drummond Company
 EBSCO Industries
 Encompass Health - nation's largest rehabilitative services company
 Express Oil Change & Tire Engineers
 Golden Flake
 Gulf South Conference
 Harbert Management Corporation
 Hibbett Sports
 Hoar Construction
 Maynard, Cooper & Gale, P.C.
 McWane
 Motion Industries
 Milo's Hamburgers
 O'Neal Steel
 ProAssurance Corporation
 Protective Life Corporation - insurance provider
 Regions Financial Corporation
 Shipt
 Southeastern Conference - SEC
 Southern Company Services
 Southern Family Markets
 Southern Nuclear - nuclear division of Southern Company
 Southern Progress Corporation - publisher of Southern Living magazine, owned by Time Warner
 Southern Research Institute
 Southwestern Athletic Conference - SWAC
 Spire Alabama - Spire Energy
 Surgical Care Affiliates
 Taziki's Mediterranean Cafe
 United Investors Life
 University of Alabama at Birmingham (UAB) college and medical center
 Vulcan Materials Company - largest aggregates producer

Fortune 500
As of 2019, Birmingham has one Fortune 500 public company: Regions Financial Corporation (#447). Two more Birmingham companies rank in the top 1000: Vulcan Materials Company (#588), Encompass Health (#596).

Private companies with revenue over one billion
Several privately held companies headquartered in Birmingham have annual revenues exceeding one billion dollars. These include American Cast Iron Pipe Company, Brasfield & Gorrie, BE&K, Drummond Company, EBSCO Industries, Harbert Management Corporation, McWane, and O'Neal Steel.

Corporations with large operations in Birmingham
 AT&T (previously BellSouth) - South Central Bell was headquartered in Birmingham; significant operations in the metro area
 Belk - regional headquarters
 CVS Caremark Corporation
 Jack Henry & Associates
 KBR, Inc. - division headquarters
 Metavante Corporation
 Mueller Water Products - administrative headquarters
 PNC Bank
 Southern Company
 State Farm Insurance Companies - regional and operations headquarters
 SunGard - regional and division headquarters
 Synovus Financial
 U.S. Steel Corporation
 UnitedHealth Group
 Washington Group International - regional headquarters, RUST headquarters
 Wells Fargo & Co. - regional headquarters

Corporations defunct or formerly headquartered in Birmingham
 Alabama National BanCorporation - merged with RBC Bank
 AmSouth Bancorporation - merged with Regions
 Big B Drugs - merged with Revco, now part of CVS
 BioCryst Pharmaceuticals
 Bruno's Supermarkets
 CVS Caremark - moved headquarters in 2004
 Energen Corporation - acquired by Diamondback Energy in 2018
 Golf Channel - moved production to Orlando
 Just For Feet - ceased operations in 2004
 Liberty National Life Insurance Company
 MedPartners - changed name to Caremark Rx
 Saks Incorporated - relocated headquarters to New York City after reorganization
 Sonat, Inc. - merged with El Paso Corporation
 SouthTrust Corporation - merged with Wachovia
 Torchmark Corporation - insurance provider
 Walter Energy, Inc.

Companies based in Birmingham, Alabama
Companies